Hutchison Branch is a stream in Cooper County in the U.S. state of Missouri.

Hutchison Branch was named after one Mr. Hutchinson, an early settler.

See also
List of rivers of Missouri

References

Rivers of Cooper County, Missouri
Rivers of Missouri